A Hillbilly Tribute to AC/DC is the first album by American band Hayseed Dixie, released in 2001 (see 2001 in music). The album consists of cover versions of hard rock AC/DC songs performed in bluegrass style.

Track listing
"Highway to Hell" (Bon Scott, Angus Young, Malcolm Young) – 2:27
"You Shook Me All Night Long" (Brian Johnson, A. Young, M. Young) – 3:29
"Dirty Deeds Done Dirt Cheap" (Scott, A. Young, M. Young) – 2:47
"Hell's Bells" (Johnson, A. Young, M. Young) – 3:00
"Money Talks" (A. Young, M. Young) – 2:19
"Let's Get It Up" (Johnson, A. Young, M. Young) – 3:01
"Have a Drink on Me" (Johnson, A. Young, M. Young) – 2:52
"T.N.T." (Scott, A. Young, M. Young) – 2:38
"Back in Black" (Johnson, A. Young, M. Young) – 3:57
"Big Balls" (Scott, A. Young, M. Young) – 2:11

Charts

References

Hayseed Dixie albums
2001 debut albums
Dualtone Records albums
AC/DC tribute albums